The Fly Products Gold is a family of Italian paramotors that was designed and produced by Fly Products of Grottammare for powered paragliding.

Design and development
The aircraft line features a paraglider-style high-wing, single-place accommodation and a single Simonini  engine in pusher configuration. As is the case with all paramotors, take-off and landing is accomplished by foot.

Over 1000 examples had been delivered by 2005.

Variants
Gold 95
Version with a  Simonini engine with a 2.4:1 reduction ratio and a  diameter propeller
Gold 130
Version with a  Simonini engine with a 2.4:1 reduction ratio and a  diameter propeller

Specifications (Gold 130)

References

1990s Italian ultralight aircraft
Single-engined pusher aircraft
Paramotors